Anderson–Thompson House, also known as Thompson–Schultz House , is a historic home located in Franklin Township, Marion County, Indiana.  It was built between about 1855 and 1860, and is a -story, ell shaped, Gothic Revival style dwelling.  It rests on a low brick foundation, has a steeply-pitched gable roof with ornately carved brackets, and is sheathed in board and batten siding.

It was added to the National Register of Historic Places in 1987.

References

Houses on the National Register of Historic Places in Indiana
Houses completed in 1860
Gothic Revival architecture in Indiana
Houses in Marion County, Indiana
National Register of Historic Places in Marion County, Indiana
National Register of Historic Places in Indianapolis